"Hoody Hooo" is the first single from TRU's 1999 album Da Crime Family, and released on No Limit Records. The single was written by Master P, Silkk The Shocker, and C-Murder and is produced by then WNBA athlete  Chantel Tremitiere and Beats By the Pound's KLC. The song peaked at #31 on the Hot R&B/Hip-Hop Singles & Tracks.

Sample credits
The song contains samples from the theme to the 1978 horror film, Halloween.

Music video
The music video was shot in New Orleans, Louisiana. The video starts off with Master P, Silkk The Shocker, and C-Murder in a military base in the future. Also in the video, there are numerous occasions when female dancers are dancing to a white background. Although there appear to be a large number of dancers, there are actually only two thanks to the use of computer graphics. Most of the TRU members are wearing Ricky Williams jerseys, since he was still playing for the New Orleans Saints in 1999 when the video was filmed, and a client of No Limit Sports Management.

Chart positions

1998 songs
1999 singles
No Limit Records singles
TRU (band) songs